Filip Dimitrov (born 13 April 1995) is a Bulgarian footballer who plays as a goalkeeper for Septemvri Simitli.

References

External links

1995 births
Living people
Bulgarian footballers
First Professional Football League (Bulgaria) players
Botev Plovdiv players
PFC Spartak Varna players
FC Septemvri Simitli players
FC Oborishte players
FC Tsarsko Selo Sofia players
FC Dunav Ruse players
OFC Pirin Blagoevgrad players
FC Septemvri Sofia players
FC Montana players
Association football goalkeepers
Sportspeople from Blagoevgrad